Bhabhta is a village in West Champaran district in the Indian state of Bihar.

Demographics
 India census, Bhabhta had a population of 7966 in 1261 households. Males constitute 52% of the population and females 47%. Bhabhta has an average literacy rate of 41.87%, lower than the national average of 74%: male literacy is 64.23%, and female literacy is 35.76%. In Bhabhta, 21.29% of the population is under 6 years of age.

References

Villages in West Champaran district